The MotorSport Vision Formula Three Cup is a national motor racing series that takes place primarily in the United Kingdom, with a small number of events in mainland Europe. It is a club racing series aimed towards amateur drivers and aspiring racers, and uses older generation single seater Formula Three cars to keep costs low. The F3 Cup has three classes covering cars built between 1981 and 2011. The series is organised by MotorSport Vision, and in 2015 it was the only Formula Three series in the United Kingdom.   Since 2021 the championship has been managed by the Monoposto Racing Club and sponsored by Hardall International.

History
MotorSport Vision Racing, which is the racing division of MotorSport Vision, announced the launch of the MSV F3 Cup in 2011. It is the successor to the BRSCC run championships/series with the names BRSCC F3, Club F3 and ARP F3.

For 2012, the club obtained championship status and from then on became known as F3 Cup.

From 2021 the Championship moved from being managed by MSV to the Monoposto Racing Club and attracted sponsorship from Hardall International

The 2022 season was cancelled due to a lack of entries and protracted discussions on the composition of the championship.

Equipment
Teams are allowed to use Formula Three chassis built after 1980 but before 2005. This allows teams to enter with cheaper equipment. The series uses a control tyre which all drivers must use. The tyres are supplied by Avon Tyres, whose parent company supply tyres to the British Formula 3 Championship. Engines will be 2 litre (2000cc) restricted engines also built between 1981 and 2005.

Due to the mix in ages, and therefore competitiveness of cars, the championship runs three classes.

Formula Three chassis built between 2008 and 2011 are eligible to enter the main championship from 2015.

Cup Class: For cars and engines built and raced between 1 January 1997 and 31 December 2007, with a maximum engine air restriction of 26.00mm diameter. From 2012, Toyota "Long Life" engines from the European Open F3 Championship are eligible with a 31mm restrictor. Opel "Long Life" engines are also permitted.
Trophy Class: For cars and engines built and raced between 1 January 1992 and 31 December 1996, with a maximum engine air restriction of up to 26.00mm diameter.
Masters Class: For cars and any engines built and raced between 1 January 1981 and 31 December 1991, with a maximum engine air restriction of up to 25.00mm diameter.
 There will also be a Guest Class for any other formula three car that the organising team have given permission to join the series or single events.

Champions

In 2011, F3 Cup was run as a series, not as a championship.    There was a prize for the most meritorious driver, which was deemed to be Aaron Steele.   The MSA granted F3 Cup championship status for 2012 onwards.

Events
The championship comprises eight rounds, each with two races. Each race weekend will comprise one 20 minute qualifying session and two or three 20 or 30 minute races.

The 2021 season features 6 rounds held in England.

See also
British Formula 3 Championship
Formula Three

References

2011 establishments in the United Kingdom
Auto racing series in the United Kingdom
Formula racing series
Formula Three series